A Vintage Year is a 1987 live album by the American jazz singer Mel Tormé, accompanied by George Shearing.

Track listing
 "Whisper Not"/"Love Me or Leave Me" (Benny Golson, Leonard Feather), (Walter Donaldson, Gus Kahn) – 4:17
 "Out of This World" (Harold Arlen, Johnny Mercer) – 5:11
 "Someday I'll Find You" (Noël Coward) – 2:52
 "Midnight Sun" (Sonny Burke, Lionel Hampton, Mercer) – 5:36
 New York, New York Medley: "For Me and My Gal"/"Mack the Knife"/"The Birth of the Blues"/"Send a Little Love My Way"/"How High the Moon"/"Theme from New York, New York" (Ray Goetz, Edgar Leslie, George Meyer)/(Bertolt Brecht, Marc Blitzstein, Kurt Weill)/(Lew Brown, Buddy DeSylva, Lew Henderson)/(Henry Mancini)/(Nancy Hamilton, Morgan Lewis)/(Fred Ebb, John Kander) – 6:01
 "The Folks Who Live On the Hill" (Oscar Hammerstein II, Jerome Kern) – 5:08
 "Bittersweet" (Sam Jones) – 5:47
 "Since I Fell for You" (Buddy Johnson) – 4:40
 "The Way You Look Tonight" (Dorothy Fields, Kern) – 3:37
 "Anyone Can Whistle"/"A Tune for Humming" (Stephen Sondheim)/(Sondheim) – 5:53
 "When Sunny Gets Blue" (Marvin Fisher, Jack Segal) – 3:29
 "Little Man, You've Had a Busy Day" (Al Hoffman, Maurice Sigler, Mabel Wayne) – 5:55

Personnel 
 Mel Tormé – vocals
 George Shearing – piano
 Jennifer Leitham – double bass
 Donny Osbourne – drums

References

Mel Tormé live albums
George Shearing live albums
1987 live albums
Albums produced by Carl Jefferson
Concord Records live albums